Jinzhou Town is a rural town in Ningxiang City, Hunan Province, China. It is home of Jinzhou New Urban Area.

Administrative division
The town is divided into four villages and two communities:
 Guanshan Community
 Quanmin Community
 Tongxing
 Jianlou
 Yantang
 Longqiao

Geography
The Wei River flows through the town.

Culture
Huaguxi is the most influential local theater.

Transportation
The Jinzhou Highway runs from Yutan Subdistrict through Chengjiao Subdistrict, Shuangjiangkou Town and Jinzhou Town to Changsha City in the Yuelu District.

The G5513 Changsha-Zhangjiajie Expressway runs southeast to Wangcheng District of Changsha, and the northwest through Chengjiao Subdistrict to Heshan District of Yiyang.

Attractions
The Mount Guan Ancient Town is a famous tourist attraction.

References

Divisions of Ningxiang
Ningxiang